Harriman Dam is a hydroelectric dam in Windham County, Vermont in the town of Whitingham.  The water from the dam flows through a penstock to a power generation plant in the adjacent town of Readsboro.

The dam was built in 1923 by the New England Power Company. Owned and operated by Great River Hydro LLC it was purchased from the TransCanada Corporation in 2017. The facility is an earthen dam with a relatively unusual concrete "Ben’s  glory hole" (freestanding conical drain) spillway, similar to another example at Monticello Dam in California.

The name comes from utility executive Henry I. Harriman, president of the New England Power Company.

References

Dams in Vermont
Reservoirs in Vermont
TC Energy dams
Embankment dams
Hydroelectric power plants in Vermont
Dams completed in 1923
Energy infrastructure completed in 1923
Buildings and structures in Whitingham, Vermont
Bodies of water of Windham County, Vermont
1923 establishments in Vermont